I Love That Crazy Little Thing is a 2016 Chinese romantic comedy film directed by Snow Zou and starring William Chan, Tang Yixin and Jessica Jung. It was released in China by EMP Distribution (Beijing) and Wanda Shengshi Film Distribution on August 12, 2016.

Plot
Jiang Yang (William Chan) is an editor who dreams of becoming a movie director. In efforts to pursue his passion, however, Yang encounters several challenges. These lead him to crazy yet memorable adventures alongside his girlfriend, Qianqian (Jessica Jung).

Cast
William Chan as Jiang Yang
Tang Yixin 
Jessica Jung as Qian qian 
Nicholas Tse
Gillian Chung 
Jack Kao 
Liu Xiaoqian
Nik Wang 
Rock Ji 
Mike Sui 
Suolang Nima 
Seo In-guk 
He Jiong 
Du Haitao
Sun Yi

Reception
The film has grossed  at the Chinese box office.

See also
But Always, another film by the same director

References

Chinese romantic comedy films
2016 romantic comedy films